The Canadian Centre for Occupational Health and Safety (CCOHS) is an independent departmental corporation under Schedule II of the Financial Administration Act and is accountable to Parliament through the Minister of Labour.

CCOHS functions as the primary national agency in Canada for the advancement of safe and healthy workplaces and preventing work-related injuries, illnesses and deaths. Additional work in this area is carried out by provincial and territorial labour departments and workers' compensation.

CCOHS was created in 1978 by an Act of Parliament – Canadian Centre for Occupational Health and Safety Act S.C., 1977–78, c. 29. The act was based on the belief that all Canadians had "…a fundamental right to a healthy and safe working environment".

The centre, located in Hamilton, Ontario, is governed by a tripartite Council of Governors representing government (federal, provincial and territorial), employers, and workers.

CCOHS promotes the total well-being—physical, psychosocial and mental health—of working Canadians by providing information, training, education, management systems and solutions. It makes credible information about workplace hazards and conditions easily and widely accessible to all Canadians - promoting safe and healthy workplaces.

Services
 Partial online list (with hyperlinks) of occupational safety regulations in Canada and its provinces
 Safety InfoLine Service - the free, confidential, person-to-person information service for Canadians
 OSH Answers - Q&A on CCOHS website
 Health and Safety Report - free monthly electronic newsletter
 Flu and Infectious Disease Outbreak Planning portal - tools, tips and resources
 Advancing Healthy Workplaces portal - information on creating healthy workplaces
 Webinar presentations
 Podcasts on a variety of issues and topics as well as interviews with experts
 Workplace Hazardous Materials Information System (WHMIS) Classification Database
 Young Workers Zone website for new and young workers, addressing the high levels of injuries and illnesses suffered by this group of workers
 CANOSH website – a web portal of links to Canadian occupational health and safety information that is provided by federal, provincial and territorial government agencies, Workers' Compensation Boards and the Canadian Centre for Occupational Health and Safety. The site aims to make this information readily and easily accessible to Canadians in the continuing effort to prevent workplace injury and illness and help create healthy workplaces. Canosh was created and is maintained by the Canadian Centre for Occupational Health and Safety.
 Podcasts - new episodes added monthly
 e-courses
 Registry of Toxic Effects of Chemical Substances (RTECS)
 Chemical safety databases and services
 MSDS Management Service
 OSH Works Occupational Health and Safety Management Service
 Health and safety promotional tools
 Health and safety pocket guides - CCOHS publications are offered in English and French and in several formats (print, CD ROM, DVD, PDF)
 CANWrite Safety Data Sheets authoring software

References

External links
Official site

Federal departments and agencies of Canada
Canadian federal Crown corporations
Companies based in Hamilton, Ontario
Occupational safety and health organizations
Medical and health organizations based in Ontario